In combinatorial game theory, the Sprague–Grundy theorem states that every impartial game under the normal play convention is equivalent to a one-heap game of nim, or to an infinite generalization of nim. It can therefore be represented as a natural number, the size of the heap in its equivalent game of nim, as an ordinal number in the infinite generalization, or alternatively as a nimber, the value of that one-heap game in an algebraic system whose addition operation combines multiple heaps to form a single equivalent heap in nim.

The Grundy value or nim-value of any impartial game is the unique nimber that the game is equivalent to.  In the case of a game whose positions are indexed by the natural numbers (like nim itself, which is indexed by its heap sizes), the sequence of nimbers for successive positions of the game is called the nim-sequence of the game.

The Sprague–Grundy theorem and its proof encapsulate the main results of a theory discovered independently by R. P. Sprague (1936) and P. M. Grundy (1939).

Definitions
For the purposes of the Sprague–Grundy theorem, a game is a two-player sequential game of perfect information satisfying the ending condition (all games come to an end: there are no infinite lines of play) and the normal play condition (a player who cannot move loses).

At any given point in the game, a player's position is the set of moves they are allowed to make. As an example, we can define the zero game to be the two-player game where neither player has any legal moves.

An impartial game is one in which at any given point in the game, each player is allowed exactly the same set of moves. Normal-play nim is an example of an impartial game. In nim, there are one or more heaps of objects, and two players (we'll call them Alice and Bob), take turns choosing a heap and removing 1 or more objects from it. The winner is the player who removes the final object from the final heap.  The game is impartial because for any given configuration of pile sizes, the moves Alice can make on her turn are exactly the same moves Bob would be allowed to make if it were his turn.  In contrast, a game such as checkers is not impartial because, supposing Alice were playing red and Bob were playing black, for any given arrangement of pieces on the board, if it were Alice's turn, she would only be allowed to move the red pieces, and if it were Bob's turn, he would only be allowed to move the black pieces.

Note that any configuration of an impartial game can therefore be written as a single position, because the moves will be the same no matter whose turn it is. For example, the position of the zero game can simply be written , because if it's Alice's turn, she has no moves to make, and if it's Bob's turn, he has no moves to make either.
A move can be associated with the position it leaves the next player in. 

Doing so allows positions to be defined recursively.  For example, consider the following game of Nim played by Alice and Bob.

Example Nim Game 

We name this position . 
 At step 5, Alice had exactly one option: to remove one object from heap C, leaving Bob with no moves.  Since her move leaves Bob in position , her position is written .  We name this position .
 At step 4, Bob had two options: remove one from B or remove one from C.  Note, however, that it didn't really matter which heap Bob removed the object from: Either way, Alice would be left with exactly one object in exactly one pile. So, using our recursive definition, Bob really only has one move: .
 At step 3, Alice had 3 options: remove two from C, remove one from C, or remove one from B.  Removing two from C leaves Bob in position . Removing one from C leaves Bob with two piles, each of size one, i.e., position , as described in step 4. However, removing 1 from B would leave Bob with two objects in a single pile. We call this position . Alice's position is then the set of all her moves: .
 Following the same recursive logic, at step 2, Bob's position is 
 Finally, at step 1, Alice's position is

Nimbers
In general, the nimber  corresponds to the position in a game of nim where there are exactly  objects in exactly one heap.  

While the word nimber comes from the game nim, nimbers can be used to describe the positions of any finite, impartial game, and in fact, the Sprague–Grundy theorem states that every  instance of a finite, impartial game can be associated with a single nimber.

Combining Games
Two games can be combined by adding their positions together.

Example Game 2

Combined Game

To differentiate between the two games, for the first example game, we'll label its starting position , and color it blue:

For the second example game, we'll label the starting position  and color it red:

To compute the starting position of the combined game, remember that a player can either make a move in the first game, leaving the second game untouched, or make a move in the second game, leaving the first game untouched.  So the combined game's starting position is:

The explicit formula for adding positions is: , which means that addition is both commutative and associative.

Equivalence 
Positions in impartial games fall into two outcome classes: either the next player (the one whose turn it is) wins (an - position), or the previous player wins (a - position).  So, for example,  is a -position, while  is an -position.

Formally,

To use our running examples, notice that in both the first and second games above, we can show that on every turn, Alice has a move that forces Bob into a -position. (Notice that in the combined game, Bob is the player with the -positions. In fact,  is a -position, which as we will see in Lemma 2, means .)

First Lemma
As an intermediate step to proving the main theorem, we show that for every position  and every -position , the equivalence  holds.  By the above definition of equivalence, this amounts to showing that  and  share an outcome class for all .

Suppose that  is a -position. So  must also be a -position.

On the other hand, if  is an -position, then  is also an -position, because the next player has a winning strategy: choose a -position from among the  options, and we conclude from the previous paragraph that adding  to that position is still a -position.  Thus, in this case,  must be a -position, just like .

As these are the only two cases, the lemma holds.

Second Lemma
As a further step, we show that  if and only if  is a -position.

In the forward direction, suppose that .

In the reverse direction, since  is a -position by hypothesis, it follows from the first lemma, that . Similarly, since  is also a -position, it follows from the first lemma in the form   that . By associativity and commutativity, the right-hand sides of these results are equal. Furthermore,  is an equivalence relation because equality is an equivalence relation on outcome classes.

Proof
We prove that all positions are equivalent to a nimber by structural induction.  The more specific result, that the given game's initial position must be equivalent to a nimber, shows that the game is itself equivalent to a nimber.

Consider a position . By the induction hypothesis, all of the options are equivalent to nimbers, say . So let .

The first thing we need to note is that , by way of the second lemma. If  is zero, the claim is trivially true. Otherwise, consider . After this, the position is a -position by the lemma's forward implication. Therefore,  is a -position, and, citing the lemma's reverse implication, .

Now let us show that  is a -position, which, using the second lemma once again, means that . We do so by giving an explicit strategy for the previous player.

Then  is the null set, clearly a -position.

Or consider the case that the next player moves in the component  to the option  where . And, as shown before, any position plus itself is a -position.

Finally, suppose instead that the next player moves in the component  to the option .

By transitivity, we conclude that , as desired.

Development
If  is a position of an impartial game, the unique integer  such that  is called its Grundy value, or Grundy number, and the function that assigns this value to each such position is called the Sprague–Grundy function.  R. L. Sprague and P. M. Grundy independently gave an explicit definition of this function, not based on any concept of equivalence to nim positions, and showed that it had the following properties:
 A position is a loss for the next player to move (i.e. a -position) if and only if its Grundy value is zero; and
The Grundy value of the sum of a finite set of positions is just the nim-sum of the Grundy values of its summands.
Thus, although Sprague and Grundy never explicitly stated the theorem described in this article, it follows directly from their results and is credited to them.
These results have subsequently been developed into the field of combinatorial game theory, notably by Richard Guy, Elwyn Berlekamp, John Horton Conway and others, where they are now encapsulated in the Sprague–Grundy theorem and its proof in the form described here. The field is presented in the books Winning Ways for your Mathematical Plays and On Numbers and Games.

See also
Genus theory
Indistinguishability quotient

References

External links
 Grundy's game at cut-the-knot
 Easily readable, introductory account from the UCLA Math Department
 The Game of Nim at sputsoft.com
 

Combinatorial game theory
Theorems in discrete mathematics